The 1964–65 Washington State Cougars men's basketball team represented Washington State University for the 1964–65 NCAA college basketball season. Led by seventh-year head coach Marv Harshman, the Cougars were members of the Athletic Association of Western Universities (AAWU, Pac-8) and played their home games on campus at Bohler Gymnasium in Pullman, Washington.

References

External links
Sports Reference – Washington State Cougars: 1964–65 basketball season

Washington State Cougars men's basketball seasons
Washington State Cougars
Washington State
Washington State